Sagamore Hill, also called "Pow Wow Hill", is a summit in Barnstable County, Massachusetts. Indian leaders, also called sagamores, met upon the hill, leading to both of its names.

References

Mountains of Massachusetts
Mountains of Barnstable County, Massachusetts